John Coffey, DD (b and d County Kerry 10 January 1836; 14 April 1904) was an Irish Roman Catholic Bishop in the late nineteenth and early 20th centuries.

Coffey was educated at St Patrick's College, Maynooth and ordained in 1865. He was Bishop of Ardfert and Aghadoe from 1889 until his death. He is buried at St Mary's Cathedral, Killarney.

References

1836 births
1904 deaths
20th-century Roman Catholic bishops in Ireland
Roman Catholic Bishops of Ardfert and Agahdoe
Alumni of St Patrick's College, Maynooth
Clergy from County Kerry
19th-century Roman Catholic bishops in Ireland